The East Washington Line was a local streetcar route of the Pacific Electric Railway serving Pasadena. It ran from Downtown Pasadena to East Washington Village, by way of Los Robles Avenue and Washington Boulevard. The extension to Tierra Alta opened in 1912. The line was abandoned after July 29, 1923. Service was thereafter provided by buses.

References

Pacific Electric routes
History of Pasadena, California
Light rail in California
Railway services discontinued in 1923
1923 disestablishments in California
Closed railway lines in the United States